Awad Al Darmaki is an Emirati poet, lecturer and writer in the fields of strategic planning, human development and institutional development.

Career 
He obtained a master's degree in executive and organizational leadership in 2002 from the University of San Diego in the United States|United States, and a bachelor's degree in business administration from the United Arab Emirates University.

He served as an advisor to the chairman of the Board of Directors of the Department of Municipal Affairs and Transport in Abu Dhabi (2014-2018), executive director of Al Ain Club (2010), and Director General of Al Ain City Municipality (2007-2009). And Assistant Undersecretary for Administrative and Financial Affairs at Al Ain City Municipality (2005-2007).

He published books including: "Do not torture him," "Dinosaurs do not know how to drive a Cadillac," "San Diego Memories," and "The Oak Book", He was also a preparer and presenter for the "Fingerprints" program, part one and two, on Dubai TV. He also presenting "Our Islam is a Civilization" Program on Alshareka TV.

He is an opinion writer for Al-Ain News website, Al Bayan Newspaper, and "The Eighth Day" Newspaper.

Books

Quotes 
 "Whoever thinks that leaving one's home is an easy matter has gone far from the truth. Traveling for leisure and recreation is not like traveling to spend years for the sake of martyrdom. The first is pleasant and passes on the soul like the dewy breezes of magic, and the other is boring, almost holding the breath of the expatriate because of its weight and depression, and does not tell you like an expert!."
 "If you are one of those whom God has guided and luck smiled at him to be a manager, you will experience feelings of joy and will be met with feelings of fear and tension. You are not the only one who feels this. You will quickly pass through moments of joy, followed by the stage of (dilemma) if you will, and you are wondering where to start? How do I start? And what should a manager really do?."

Poems 
 There.
 The Oaks.
 My Eye Sight.
 I Bled Poem.

See also 
 Ali Al Reesh
 Ahlam Bsharat
 Hazim Abdallah Khedr
 Muhammad Aziz Arfaj
 Mohmaed Abid

References

External links
 Awad Al Darmaki's account on Twitter
 "Fingerprints" program series

21st-century Emirati poets
Living people

Year of birth missing (living people)

University of San Diego alumni
United Arab Emirates University alumni